The 2000 Oceania Swimming Championships were held 21–24 June 2000 at the Queen Elizabeth II pool in Christchurch, New Zealand. This was the third edition of the Championships, and swimming all competition listed below was conducted in a 50m (long-course) pool.

Event schedule

Results

Men

Women

Participating countries

unattached swimmers from Fiji

References

Results from 2000 Oceania Swimming Championships (Archived 2009-07-22) from www.swiminfo.co.nz; retrieved 7 July 2009.
Results from 2000 Oceania Swimming Championships (Archived 2009-07-22) from HawaiiSwim.org; retrieved 7 July 2009.

Oceania Swimming Championships, 2000
Swimming competitions in New Zealand
Oceania Swimming Championships
Oceania Swimming Championships, 2000
Oceania Swimming Championships, 2000
International aquatics competitions hosted by New Zealand
June 2000 sports events in New Zealand